Odites subsignella is a moth in the family Depressariidae. It was described by Hans Rebel in 1893. It is found in the Caucasus.

The wingspan is about 15 mm. The forewings are evenly infuscated with grey. There are two dark dots, the first at one-third. The hindwings are whitish grey.

References

Moths described in 1893
Odites